This is a list of exceptional set concepts. In mathematics, and in particular in mathematical analysis, it is very useful to be able to characterise subsets of a given set X as 'small', in some definite sense, or 'large' if their complement in X is small. There are numerous concepts that have been introduced to study 'small' or 'exceptional' subsets. In the case of sets of natural numbers, it is possible to define more than one concept of 'density', for example. See also list of properties of sets of reals.

Almost all
Almost always
Almost everywhere
Almost never
Almost surely
Analytic capacity
Closed unbounded set
Cofinal (mathematics)
Cofinite
Dense set
IP set
2-large
Large set (Ramsey theory)
Meagre set
Measure zero
Natural density
Negligible set
Nowhere dense set
Null set, conull set
Partition regular
Piecewise syndetic set
Schnirelmann density
Small set (combinatorics)
Stationary set
Syndetic set
Thick set
Thin set (Serre)

Exceptional
Exceptional